Characteristic numbers are dimensionless numbers used in fluid dynamics to describe a character of the flow. To compare a real situation (e.g. an aircraft) with a small-scale model it is necessary to keep the important characteristic numbers the same. Names of these numbers were standardized in ISO 31, part 12.

Dimensionless numbers
Fluid dynamics